Ronald Martin Popeil (May 3, 1935 – July 28, 2021), was an American inventor and marketing personality, and founder of the direct response marketing company Ronco. He made appearances in infomercials for the Showtime Rotisserie and coined the phrase "Set it, and forget it!" as well as popularizing the phrase, "But wait, there's more!" on television as early as the mid-1950s.

Personal life and career
Popeil was born to a Jewish family in Manhattan in 1935, the son of Julia (Schwartz) and Samuel Popeil. When he was six, his parents divorced and he and his brother went to live in Florida with their grandparents. At age 17 in 1952, he went with his grandparents to work for his father at his company's (Popeil Brothers) manufacturing facility in Chicago. His grandparents later returned to Florida and Popeil remained with his father.

When he was 18, Popeil attended the University of Illinois at Urbana-Champaign where he joined Alpha Epsilon Pi before withdrawing after six months. 

After returning from college, Popeil continued to work and learn from his father, who was also an inventor and salesman of numerous kitchen-related gadgets, such as the Chop-O-Matic and the Veg-O-Matic. The Chop-O-Matic retailed for US$3.98 and sold over two million units.

The invention of the Chop-O-Matic caused a problem that marked the entrance of Ron Popeil into television. The Chop-O-Matic was so efficient at chopping vegetables that it was impractical for salesmen to carry all the vegetables needed for the demonstrations over the course of a day. The solution was to tape the demonstration. Once the demonstration was taped, it was a short step to broadcasting it as a commercial.

Popeil initially operated as a distributor of his father's kitchen products and later formed his own company, Ronco, in 1964. He continued as a distributor for his father and added additional products from other manufacturers. Ron Popeil and his father became competitors in the 1970s for the same retail store business.

Popeil received the Ig Nobel Prize in Consumer Engineering in 1993. The awards committee described him as the "incessant inventor and perpetual pitchman of late night television" and awarded the prize in recognition of his "redefining the industrial revolution" with his devices. He was a past member of the board of directors of Mirage Resorts, where he served for 22 years under Steve Wynn, as well as a past member of the board of directors of MGM Hotels for seven years under Kirk Kerkorian. He became the recipient of the Electronic Retail Association's Lifetime Achievement award in 2001 and he is listed in the Direct Response Hall of Fame.

Popeil was previously a member of the advisory board for University of California, Los Angeles' Business, Management, and Legal Programs. In August 2005, he sold his company, Ronco, to Fi-Tek VII, a Denver holding company, for US$55 million, with plans to continue serving as the spokesman and inventor while being able to spend more time with his family.

In 1956, Popeil married Marilyn Greene, with whom he had two daughters; they divorced in 1963. He married Lisa Boehne some time after this and had one daughter with her. He and Boehne divorced sometime before 1995, when he married Robin Angers, with whom he had two more daughters. Ashley Tisdale and Jennifer Tisdale are his cousins.

Death 
Popeil died on July 28, 2021, at Cedars-Sinai Medical Center at age 86. He had been sent there a day earlier for a medical emergency. No cause of death was given.  According to his half-sister, Lisa Popeil, the cause of death was a brain hemorrhage.

Inventions 

Popeil is noted for marketing and in some cases inventing a wide variety of products. Among the better known and more successful are the Chop-O-Matic hand food processor ("Ladies and gentlemen, I'm going to show you the greatest kitchen appliance ever made ... All your onions chopped to perfection without shedding a single tear."), the Dial-O-Matic successor to the Veg-O-Matic ("Slice a tomato so thin it only has one side."), and the Ronco Pocket Fisherman. Popeil is also well known for his housewares inventions like his Giant Dehydrator and Beef Jerky Machine, his Electric Pasta Maker and his Showtime Rotisserie & BBQ. His Showtime Rotisserie & BBQ sold over eight million units in the US alone, helping Ronco's housewares sales exceed $1 billion in sales. After retiring, Popeil continued to invent products including the 5in1 Turkey Fryer & Food Cooking System which he had been developing for over ten years.

Popular culture 
Popeil's success in infomercials, memorable marketing personality, and ubiquity on American television have allowed him and his products to appear in a variety of popular media environments including cameo appearances on television shows such as The X-Files, Futurama,  King of the Hill,  The Simpsons, Sex and the City, The Daily Show, and The West Wing. Parodies of Popeil's infomercials were done on the comedy show Saturday Night Live by Dan Aykroyd and Eddie Murphy and the "Veg-O-Matic" may have provided comedian Gallagher inspiration for the "Sledge-O-Matic" routine since the 1980s. The animated series VeggieTales once featured a parody of the "Veg-O-Matic" dubbed as the "Forgive-O-Matic". "Additionally, the professional wrestling tag team The Midnight Express dubbed their finishing move the Veg-O-Matic. 

Popeil was voted by Self magazine readers as one of the 25 people who have changed the way we eat, drink and think about food.

Popeil has been referenced in the music of Alice Cooper, the Beastie Boys, and "Weird Al" Yankovic. Yankovic's song "Mr. Popeil" was a tribute (and featured his sister Lisa Popeil on backing vocals). Ron Popeil later used this song in some of his infomercials.

In Malcolm Gladwell's book What the Dog Saw: And Other Adventures, Popeil is interviewed and many of his products, most notably the Veg-O-Matic and Showtime Rotisserie, are discussed. Malcolm Gladwell's New Yorker piece "The Pitchman" about Popeil won Gladwell the 2001 National Magazine award. The article was first published in The New Yorker in 2000.

Notes

References

Further reading

External links 
 Synopsis of the Biography of Ron Popeil on A & E 
 
 
 
 

1935 births
2021 deaths
20th-century American inventors
American businesspeople in retailing
American salespeople
Businesspeople from New York City
University of Illinois Urbana-Champaign alumni
Infomercials
American people of Jewish descent